Kızılören District is a district of Afyonkarahisar Province of Turkey. Its seat is the town Kızılören. Its area is 111 km2, and its population is 2,161 (2021).

Composition
There is one municipality in Kızılören District:
 Kızılören

There are 4 villages in Kızılören District:
Ekinova
Gülyazı
Türkbelkavak
Yenibelkavak

References

Districts of Afyonkarahisar Province